Cristiceps is a genus of clinids native to the Indo-Pacific waters around Australia and New Zealand.

Species
 Cristiceps argyropleura Kner, 1865 (Silver-sided weedfish)
 Cristiceps aurantiacus Castelnau, 1879 (Golden weedfish)
 Cristiceps australis Valenciennes, 1836 (Crested weedfish)

References

 
Clinidae
Ray-finned fish genera